Semnocera procellaris is a moth of the family Gracillariidae. It is known from South Africa.

The larvae feed on Ekebergia species. They mine the leaves of their host plant. The mine has the form of a large, irregular, very oblong, transparent blotch-mine, beginning at or near the margin of the leaf as a wide gallery which soon widens into a blotch.

References

Endemic moths of South Africa
Gracillariinae
Moths of Africa